Walter Ree Holmer (December 5, 1902 – August 27, 1976) was an American football player and coach. He played professionally as a quarterback and running back in the National Football League (NFL) for the Chicago Bears, Chicago Cardinals, Boston Redskins, and the Pittsburgh Pirates.  Holmer served as the head football coach at Boston University in 1942 and 1946 and at Colby College from 1947 to 1950.  He played college football at Northwestern University.

A native of Moline, Illinois, Holmer died on August 27, 1976, in Cashmere, Washington.

Head coaching record

References

External links
 
 

1902 births
1976 deaths
American football quarterbacks
American football running backs
Boston Redskins players
Boston University Terriers football coaches
Chicago Bears players
Chicago Cardinals players
Colby Mules football coaches
Northwestern Wildcats football players
Pittsburgh Pirates (football) players
People from Moline, Illinois
Coaches of American football from Illinois
Players of American football from Illinois